Benjamin Jacob Kaplan (born 31 January 1960) is a historian and professor of Dutch history at University College London and the University of Amsterdam.

He taught at University of Iowa.
He is a 2011 Guggenheim Fellow.

According to The New York Times, in his 2007 book Religious Conflict and the Practice of Toleration in Early Modern Europe, Kaplan "maintains that religious toleration declined from around 1550 to 1750,"  and that Europeans responded by devising "intricate boundaries allowing them to live more or less peaceably with neighbors whose rival beliefs were anathema."

He received his PhD from Harvard University.

Books

Calvinists and Libertines: confession and community in Utrecht, 1578-1620, Clarendon Press, 1995, 

Benjamin J. Kaplan, Bob Moore, Henk Van Nierop, Judith Pollmann, (eds.) Catholic Communities in Protestant States: Britain and the Netherlands C.1570-1720, Manchester University Press, 2009,

References

1960 births
Living people
Historians of Europe
University of Iowa faculty
Academic staff of the University of Amsterdam
Professors of Dutch History at University College London
Historians of the Netherlands
Harvard University alumni